Colonel James Lennox Dawson VC (25 December 1891 – 15 February 1967) was a Scottish recipient of the Victoria Cross, the highest and most prestigious award for gallantry in the face of the enemy that can be awarded to British and Commonwealth forces.

Dawson enlisted into the 5th Cameronians in November 1914, but transferred to the Royal Engineers in March 1915.

VC action
He was 23 years old, and a corporal in the 187th Company, Corps of Royal Engineers, British Army during the First World War when the following deed took place at the Battle of Loos, for which he was awarded the VC.

On 13 October 1915 at Hohenzollern Redoubt, France, during a gas attack, when the trenches were full of men, Corporal Dawson exposed himself fearlessly to the enemy's fire to give directions to his sappers and to clear the infantry out of sections of the trench which were full of gas. Finding three leaking cylinders, he rolled them well away from the trench, again under heavy fire, and then fired rifle bullets into them to let the gas escape. His gallantry undoubtedly saved many men from being gassed.

Later career
He was commissioned into the Royal Engineers in December 1916 and demobilised as a Major in 1919. After graduating from Glasgow University he was commissioned in the Army Education Corps in 1920, but transferred to the Indian Army Ordnance Corps in 1931.

He later achieved the rank of colonel. By co-incidence his second cousin (their fathers were first cousins) James Dalgleish Pollock was also awarded the Victoria Cross in the same battle at the Hohenzolleren Redoubt. He too saved his colleagues from certain death by climbing out of the trench and bombing German infiltrators out of the British lines. Both boys were born in the small Scottish town of Tillicoultry, though James Dawson's family moved to the county town of Alloa when he was eight. Both were considered local heroes in 1915 and were feted in Alloa and Tillicoultry in separate civic receptions, allied to recruitment drives.

His VC is held by the University of Glasgow where he earned his BSc and is displayed at the Hunterian Museum.

References

Monuments to Courage (David Harvey, 1999)
The Register of the Victoria Cross (This England, 1997)
The Sapper VCs (Gerald Napier, 1998)
Scotland's Forgotten Valour (Graham Ross, 1995)
VCs of the First World War - The Western Front 1915 (Peter F. Batchelor & Christopher Matson, 1999)

External links
Royal Engineers Museum Sappers VCs 
Location of grave and VC medal (East Sussex) 

1891 births
1967 deaths
British Army personnel of World War I
British World War I recipients of the Victoria Cross
Royal Engineers officers
Royal Army Educational Corps officers
British Indian Army officers
Royal Engineers soldiers
Cameronians soldiers
People from Tillicoultry
Alumni of the University of Glasgow
People educated at Alloa Academy
British Army recipients of the Victoria Cross